The 1942 Rhode Island gubernatorial election was held on November 3, 1942. Incumbent Democrat J. Howard McGrath defeated Republican nominee James O. McManus with 58.54% of the vote.

General election

Candidates
J. Howard McGrath, Democratic 
James O. McManus, Republican

Results

References

1942
Rhode Island
Gubernatorial